Blanca Pilar Fernández Morena (born 1972) is a Spanish politician member of the Spanish Socialist Workers' Party (PSOE), regional minister of Equality and a Spokesperson of the Government of Castilla–La Mancha since July 2019. She was a member of the 8th and 9th Cortes of Castilla–La Mancha as well as the 13th Congress of Deputies.

Biography

Early life 
Born on 6 March 1972, she studied Social Work in Cuenca. She served as Mayor of Porzuna between 2001 and 2008.

Regional legislator 

Fernández ran second in the Spanish Socialist Workers' Party (PSOE) list for Ciudad Real vis-à-vis the 2011 regional election in Castilla–La Mancha headed by Nemesio de Lara; she was elected member of the 8th term of the regional legislature, during which she served as Second Secretary in the parliament's Bureau. Secretary of Organization of the Ciudad Real's branch of the PSOE, she renovated her seat at the 2015 regional election, and, following the restructuring of the Socialist Parliamentary Group in the midst of the 9th regional legislative term, she became the spokesperson of her parliamentary group, replacing .

Member of the Congress of Deputies 
She contested the April 2019 general election, running as candidate to the Lower House for Ciudad Real. She was elected and became a member of the 13th Congress of Deputies.

Minister of the Government of Castilla–La Mancha 
In July 2019, following the results of the May 2019 regional election in Castilla–La Mancha that delivered a qualified majority to the PSOE, Fernández was appointed by Emiliano García-Page (the regional premier who had renovated his mandate for a second term) as Minister for Equality and Spokesperson of the Government of Castilla–La Mancha, thus leaving her seat at the national legislature. She assumed office on 8 July along the rest of ministers of the cabinet.

References 

1972 births
Government ministers of Castilla–La Mancha
Living people
Members of the 8th Cortes of Castilla–La Mancha
Members of the 9th Cortes of Castilla–La Mancha
Members of the 13th Congress of Deputies (Spain)
Mayors of places in Castilla–La Mancha
Women mayors of places in Spain
Women members of the Congress of Deputies (Spain)
Municipal councillors in the province of Ciudad Real